Dolley is a surname, also used as a given name. Notable people with the name include:

Surname
Brad Dolley (born 1992), South African cricketer
Corbyn Dolley (born 1987), South African cricketer
Denzil Dolley (born 1977), field hockey player
Jason Dolley (born 1991), American actor
Joseph Norman Dolley (1860–1940), bank commissioner of State of Kansas
Josh Dolley (born 1992), South African cricketer
Richard Dolley (1960–2021), South African cricketer, educator, cricket and hockey administrator
Sarah Dolley (1829–1909), American physician

Given name
Dolley Madison (1768–1849), spouse of the fourth President of the United States, James Madison
William Dolley Tipton, World War I US Air Force flying ace

See also
Dolly (name), a similar-sounding name
Dolly (disambiguation)
Dollie (disambiguation)